The 2010 FINA Women's Water Polo World League was the seventh edition of the event, organised by the world's governing body in aquatics, the FINA. After playing in groups within the same continent, eight teams qualify to play in a final tournament, called the Super Final in La Jolla, California from June 28 to July 3, 2010.

Super Final 
 June, 28 – July 3, 2010, La Jolla, California

Seeding

Knockout stage

Semifinals

All times are PST (UTC-8)

Bronze medal match

All times are PST (UTC-8)

Final

All times are PST (UTC-8)

5th–8th Places

Final ranking 

Team Roster
Betsey Armstrong, Heather Petri, Erika Figge, Brenda Villa (C), Lauren Wenger, Courtney Mathewson, Jessica Steffens, Lolo Silver, Elsie Windes, Kelly Rulon, Annika Dries, Kami Craig, Emily Feher, Melissa Seidemann, Maggie Steffens. Head coach: Adam Krikorian.

Individual awards
Most Valuable Player

Top Scorer
 — 15 goals
Media All Star Team
 — Goalkeaper
 — Center Forward

References

2010
International water polo competitions hosted by the United States
World League, women
Fina World League, women